The Beautiful Days of Aranjuez is a 2016 drama film directed by Wim Wenders. It is based on the 2012 play Die schönen Tage von Aranjuez by Peter Handke. It was selected to compete for the Golden Lion at the 73rd Venice International Film Festival.

Plot
A man (Reda Kateb) and a woman (Sophie Semin) are sitting on chairs in a garden outside of Paris on a bright summer day. All day long they talk about life and love.

Cast
 Reda Kateb as the man
 Sophie Semin as the woman
 Nick Cave as himself
 Peter Handke as the gardener
 Jens Harzer as the writer

Reception
The film garnered a 14% approval rating from 7 critics, with an average rating of 3.2 out of 10, on Rotten Tomatoes. Metacritic provides a score of 32 out of 100 from 6 critics, which indicates "generally unfavorable" reviews.

Peter Bradshaw of The Guardian gave the film 2 stars out of 5, calling it "an inert and exasperatingly supercilious two-hander: self-conscious, tedious, with a dated and cumbersome theatricality, tricked out in a 3D presentation that adds nothing to its dull stereoscopic tableaux of an idealised French garden outside Paris." Deborah Young of The Hollywood Reporter praised Virginie Hernvann's production design.

Ben Croll of IndieWire gave the film a grade of D, saying, "I think it could live on as a curiosity, as an answer to the question, 'What is the most uniquely spoiler-impervious film since Andy Warhol aimed his camera at the Empire State Building and let it roll for eight hours?'" Guy Lodge of Variety said, "Even for Wenders completists, the film is of mostly academic interest: an intermediate entry in the filmmaker's ongoing investigation into the possibilities of stereoscopic imagery, thus far deployed to far more vibrant effect in his documentaries than in his narrative work."

References

External links
 

2016 films
2016 drama films
French drama films
German drama films
2010s French-language films
Films based on works by Peter Handke
Films directed by Wim Wenders
Aranjuez
2010s French films
2010s German films